Mansbestfriend Pt. 2: No Thanks is a studio album by American hip hop artist Sole. Originally self-released in 2003, the album was repackaged and remastered with additional tracks and released by Morr Music in 2004 under the title The New Human Is Illegal, with Sole using "Mansbestfriend" as an alternate moniker.

Critical reception

John Bush of AllMusic gave the album 3 stars out of 5, saying: "Give credit to Sole for turning the hip-hop hat trick; he has no trouble creating a glorious mess of a record in true Anticon style, but he also adds the hooks to keep listeners digging in, and remains an excellent rapper despite producing and performing." Scott Reid of Cokemachineglow said, "Sole does a great job at making this an unpredictable and consistently interesting barrage of layered vocals, non-sequitur pop samples and distorted beats, all meshed together in an extremely rough, muddled mix."

Track listing

Personnel
Credits adapted from the 2004 edition liner notes.

 Sole – music
 Odd Nosdam – additional keyboards (3), mixing (3–8, 13, 14, 16)
 Doseone – additional music (4, 6)
 Jel – additional music (4, 6)
 Telephone Jim Jesus – guitar (9), keyboards (9)
 Why? – drums (13)
 D&M – mastering
 Yasamin Al-Hussaini – cover
 Jan Kruse – cover

References

External links
 
 

2003 albums
2004 albums
Sole (hip hop artist) albums
Morr Music albums